Lloydminster is a provincial electoral district for the Legislative Assembly of Saskatchewan, Canada. The district was originally created for the 1908 election. The constituency was reconstituted by the Representation Act, 1994 (Saskatchewan), mostly out of the former district of Cut Knife-Lloydminster and parts of Meadow Lake, Turtleford and Redberry.

The riding was last contested in the 2020 general election, when it returned Saskatchewan Party MLA Colleen Young.

Other communities in the riding include the towns of Marshall, Pierceland, and Paradise Hill.

History 
Lloydminster originally returned an NDP member after its creation, but has returned Saskatchewan Party members since the 1999 general election.

Members of the Legislative Assembly

Election results

|-

|- bgcolor="white"
!align="left" colspan=3|Total
!align="right"|4,211
!align="right"|100.00
!align="right"|

|-

|- bgcolor="white"
!align="left" colspan=3|Total
!align="right"|5,252
!align="right"|100.00%
!align="right"|

|-

|- bgcolor="white"
!align="left" colspan=3|Total
!align="right"|4,014
!align="right"|100.00%
!align="right"|

|-

|- bgcolor="white"
!align="left" colspan=3|Total
!align="right"|5,531
!align="right"|100.00%
!align="right"|

|-

| style="width: 130px" |NDP
|Violet Stanger
|align="right"|2,592
|align="right"|43.72%
|align="right"|–

|Prog. Conservative
|Steven Turnbull
|align="right"|2,326
|align="right"|39.24%
|align="right"|–

|Liberal
|Donald C. Young
|align="right"|1,010
|align="right"|17.04%
|align="right"|–
|- bgcolor="white"
!align="left" colspan=3|Total
!align="right"|5,928
!align="right"|100.00%
!align="right"|

References

External links
Website of the Legislative Assembly of Saskatchewan
Saskatchewan Archives Board – Saskatchewan Election Results By Electoral Division

Lloydminster
Saskatchewan provincial electoral districts